Nursery Boys Go Ahead, also stylized as !Nursery Boys Go Ahead!,  is an album by the Kenyan band Abana Ba Nasery. It was released in 1992. The band, a trio, traditionally produced its sound with just their voices, acoustic guitars, and a Fanta bottle. The album is considered to be Luhya pop and folk music.

Production
The album was produced by staff at Globe Style. It was recorded while the band was touring Great Britain, in 1991. Members of 3 Mustaphas 3 and the Oyster Band contributed to the album. Ron Kavana played on "Esimiti Khusilenje".

Critical reception

The Boston Globe determined Nursery Boys Go Ahead to be one of the best albums of 1992, labeling the band a "surprising guitar-and-Fanta-bottle ensemble." Robert Christgau praised "Esiesi Siolle" and "Elira Yesu Ndayanza".

The Edmonton Journal called the album "delightful," and noted the addition of "strings, trumpets, pipes and percussion" to the band's traditional instrumentation. The Chicago Sun-Times wrote that "the guitars are lilting, the harmonies are rich and resplendent ... when bouzoukis, tenor banjo and uillean pipes are added to the mix, 'Esimiti Khusilenje' takes on the rhythm of a country-Irish hoedown, albeit in a Kenyan setting." 

AllMusic opined that "if all worldbeat attempts at fusion came off like this, we'd be living in a perfect world." MusicHound World: The Essential Album Guide considered the album "another low-key masterpiece," writing that "the main attraction remains the amazing fretwork of [Shem] Tube and [Justo] Omufila."

Track listing

References

1992 albums
Albums by Kenyan artists